Ennis Avenue is a major road between Rockingham and its southern suburbs and is part of Australia's National Highway 1 for all of its length. It is a controlled access road and after leaving Rockingham has only four intersections (Willmott Drive, Safety Bay Road, Royal Palm Drive and Port Kennedy Drive)—the alternative route is Read Street and Warnbro Sound Avenue which runs roughly parallel to and west of Ennis Avenue.

The Kwinana Freeway was built to Safety Bay Road in 2002, which means that Kwinana Freeway traffic going to Mandurah and the South West of Western Australia from Perth enters Ennis Avenue near its halfway point (7.5 km) at Safety Bay Road until the extension further south in 2009. The Warnbro railway station, which opened in December 2007, is next to this intersection.

Ennis Avenue is controlled and maintained by Main Roads Western Australia.

Major intersections
The entire road's length is in the City of Rockingham, with all intersections controlled by traffic lights unless otherwise indicated.

See also

References

City of Rockingham
Highways and freeways in Perth, Western Australia
Highway 1 (Australia)